Małgorzata Barbara Niemczyk-Wolska  (born 25 October 1969) is a Polish volleyball player, coach, and member of the Sejm.

She was a member of Poland women's national volleyball team, a participant of 2003 FIVB Women's World Cup.
On September 28, 2003 Poland women's national volleyball team, including Niemczyk, beat Turkey (3–0) in final and won title of European Champion 2003.

Career
As a volleyball player initially in clubs in Lodz, then in Chemik Police and Augusto Kalisz. 
She was also a champion of Italian, Russian and Turkish clubs. 
In 2003, she played for the club team Gold Aurum, Russia. 
From 2007 to 2010, she played for KS Organika Budowlani Łódź, after which she ended her sports career. In the Polish national team played a total of 244 matches in 1989–2006.

During her sports career, she completed the 12th Liceum Ogólnokształcące im. Stanisław Wyspiański in Łódź, and then an economic studies at the Faculty of Economics and Sociology of the University of Lodz. 
She was a sports commentator, working for Eurosport, TVP and Polsat.

In the parliamentary elections in 2011, she was elected to the Sejm of the VIIth term from the PO list. 
In 2015, she became a member of the honorary support committee of Bronislaw Komorowski, before the presidential elections. 
In the same year, she successfully applied for the House of Representatives (17,741 votes).

Sporting achievements

National team
 2003  CEV European Championship

Personal life
Her mother is Barbara Niemczyk.
In 2012, she married Robert Cichon.

References

External links

 

1969 births
Living people
Polish women's volleyball players
Women members of the Sejm of the Republic of Poland
Members of the Polish Sejm 2011–2015
Members of the Polish Sejm 2015–2019
Members of the Polish Sejm 2019–2023
Politicians from Łódź
21st-century Polish women politicians
Sportspeople from Łódź